Daria Rae Berenato (born September 24, 1993) is an American professional wrestler and mixed martial artist. She is signed to WWE where she performs on the SmackDown brand under the ring name Sonya Deville. She was also an on-screen authority figure alongside Adam Pearce.

Deville rose to prominence as a contestant in the 2015 season of WWE Tough Enough, where she finished in eleventh place. Following her elimination, she signed a contract with WWE and was sent to the WWE Performance Center in Orlando, Florida. She then performed in WWE's developmental territory at the time, NXT, before moving up to the main roster. She was assigned to the Raw brand in November 2017 in a team with Mandy Rose and Paige called Absolution. Deville and Rose were later drafted to SmackDown and became Fire and Desire before eventually splitting. After taking time off in mid-2020, she returned in January 2021 in a non-wrestling role as an on-screen authority figure.

In mixed martial arts, she has competed in three fights, holding a record of 2–1.

Early life 
Berenato was born in Shamong Township, New Jersey, to Italian parents. She attended Seneca High School in Tabernacle, New Jersey. At the age of 16, Berenato began training and competing in mixed martial arts.

Professional wrestling career

WWE

Tough Enough and NXT (2015–2017) 
In June 2015, Berenato was one of the thirteen finalists for the sixth season of the WWE competition Tough Enough. She was the third competitor eliminated from the competition.

In October 2015, Berenato signed a contract with WWE, and was assigned to their developmental brand NXT to begin her training. She made her in-ring debut on December 3 during a live event against Nia Jax, which she lost. Berenato made her first televised appearance and in-ring debut under her real name on the August 17 episode of NXT, where she competed in a six-woman tag team match along with Mandy Rose, and Alexa Bliss, in which they were defeated by Carmella, Liv Morgan, and Nikki Cross. Berenato returned to television on the November 23 episode of NXT in another six-woman tag team match with The Iconic Duo (Billie Kay and Peyton Royce), where they lost to Aliyah, Ember Moon and Liv Morgan. On the December 21 episode of NXT, Berenato competed in her first televised singles match, where she was defeated by Billie Kay due to a distraction by Peyton Royce.

Berenato returned on the May 3, 2017, episode of NXT under the new ring name Sonya Deville, participating in a number one contender's battle royal for Asuka's NXT Women's Championship, where she was eliminated by Peyton Royce and Billie Kay. Following this, Deville began a winning streak, defeating Lacey Evans, Rachel Evers, Jenna Van Bemel, and Zeda. Following another short hiatus, Deville returned on the October 18 episode of NXT, where she participated in a triple threat match against Ember Moon and Ruby Riott to gain an spot on the fatal four-way match for the vacant NXT Women's Championship at NXT TakeOver: WarGames on November 18, which was won by Moon. On the November 22 episode of NXT, Deville was defeated by Ruby Riott. A rematch took place on the December 6 episode of NXT, where they faced off in a no holds barred match which Deville won. Deville then unsuccessfully challenged Ember Moon for the title on the December 27 episode of NXT.

Fire and Desire (2017–2020) 

On the November 20, 2017, episode of Raw, Deville joined Mandy Rose and Paige as they attacked Sasha Banks, Bayley, Mickie James, and Alexa Bliss. A week later, the trio's name was revealed as Absolution. Deville had her first televised match on the main roster at Tribute to the Troops on December 19, where Absolution defeated Bayley, Mickie James and Sasha Banks.

On January 28, 2018, at the Royal Rumble, Deville entered the first women's Royal Rumble match at number 10, and she eliminated Torrie Wilson, lasting 6:41 before being eliminated by Michelle McCool. She was also in the first women's Elimination Chamber match on February 25 at Elimination Chamber, where she was defeated by Bliss. In April, Paige retired from the ring due to neck injuries and became the SmackDown general manager. In her first WrestleMania appearance, at WrestleMania 34, Deville participated in the WrestleMania Women's Battle Royal, which would be won by Naomi.

During the 2018 Superstar Shake-up, both Deville and Rose were drafted to SmackDown, but Paige declared they would not receive special treatment and that Absolution is over. Throughout the summer, Deville would continue her alliance with Rose as the two remained a tag team and competed in various singles and tag team matches. On October 28, Deville also took part of the first ever all women's pay-per-view, Evolution, competing in a battle royal match where she was eliminated by Rose. In November, it was announced that Deville will take part of Team Smackdown for the upcoming traditional five-on-five elimination match at Survivor Series. In her first appearance at the event, Deville was one of the final two women of the team alongside Asuka, but she was eliminated via count out after a brawl with Bayley outside the ring. On January 27, 2019, at the Royal Rumble, Deville competed in her second Royal Rumble match, where she entered at number 25, lasting 04:26, before she was eliminated by Alexa Bliss. On February 17, Deville and Rose competed in a six-team Elimination Chamber match for the inaugural WWE Women's Tag Team Championship at the namesake pay-per-view, where they were the last team eliminated by the eventual winners Sasha Banks and Bayley.

Shortly after Fastlane, the dissolution angle between Deville and Rose was once again portrayed as both accidentally cost each other matches against SmackDown Women's Champion Asuka. Both Deville and Rose competed in the second WrestleMania Women's Battle Royal during the WrestleMania 35 pre-show, however, they were one of the last competitors eliminated from the match. In May, Deville and Rose were given the opportunity to choose between each other who would be the last competitor for the Money in the Bank ladder match at the namesake pay-per-view on May 19. Deville, who insisted on Rose getting the spot, tried to climb the ladder and help Rose win the match, however, Bayley was able to fight them off and retrieve the briefcase.

Singles competition and non-wrestling role (2020–present) 
After Rose entered a storyline love triangle with Otis and Dolph Ziggler in 2020, it was revealed on the April 3 episode of SmackDown that Deville was working with Ziggler to keep Otis from Rose. Deville then accompanied Ziggler to his match against Otis at WrestleMania 36 on April 5, during which she was attacked by Rose, who aligned herself with Otis. Later that month, Deville called Rose out to brand her selfish, vow to "ruin Rose's life", and attack her. On the May 22 episode of SmackDown, Deville and Ziggler defeated Otis and Rose in a tag team match. In July, Deville attacked Rose backstage and proceeded to cut her hair. The two were originally scheduled to compete in a hair vs. hair match at SummerSlam, but due to Deville's obligation to appear in court following the attempted kidnapping at her home, her lawyer advised her against cutting her hair short; therefore, the stipulation was changed to a No Disqualification Loser Leaves WWE match. Deville lost the match to Rose at the event in August. She began a hiatus after the defeat.

On SmackDown on January 1, 2021, Deville returned to WWE in her first appearance since August 2020, and was announced as having been reinstated. She then became the assistant to on-screen authority figure Adam Pearce on the SmackDown brand. She later also began to appear on the Raw brand and making executive decisions herself, such as reinstating Charlotte Flair after Pearce had suspended Flair, and then adding her to the Raw Women's Championship match at WrestleMania Backlash. In August 2021, Deville became involved in a feud with Naomi, which developed due to Deville's irritation with Naomi's persistence in asking her to put her in matches.

On the April 11 episode of Raw, after new Raw Women's Champion Bianca Belair had defeated Queen Zelina in a non-title match, Deville emerged and disclosed plans to name Belair's next challenger for the title. As Belair had her back turned on Deville, Deville blindsided and attacked her, revealing herself to be the mystery challenger before signing the match contract. On April 18, Deville and Belair came face-to-face, during which Belair was almost goaded into attacking Deville. Later, Deville revealed that Belair had to be fined because she laid her hands on an official. Adam Pearce fined Belair $1 and when Deville complained about this, Pearce informed Deville that there was an investigation going on concerning her conduct. On the May 9 episode of Raw, Deville was no longer a WWE official and returned as an in-ring competitor in a match she lost to the returning Alexa Bliss. Deville made a surprise appearance on the October 11 episode of NXT, where she attacked Alba Fyre from the crowd, as she aligned herself with Toxic Attraction (Gigi Dolin and Jacy Jayne) by powerbombing Fyre through the commentary table. Deville then competed at Royal Rumble on January 28, 2023, where she entered at number 27 and got 3 eliminations before being eliminated by Asuka.

Other media 
Berenato co-hosted the YouTube series UFC AfterBuzz. She appeared as a main cast member for the ninth season of Total Divas.

She made her WWE video game debut as a playable character in WWE 2K19. She also appeared in WWE 2K20, WWE 2K Battlegrounds, WWE 2K22, and WWE 2K23.

Business ventures 
On July 28, 2022, Berenato alongside fellow wrestler Amanda Saccomanno, best known as Mandy Rose, opened their own virtual donut brand named DaMandyz Donutz, delivered by Uber Eats in Los Angeles.

Personal life 
Berenato is gay, making her the first openly gay female wrestler in WWE. She described coming out as a lesbian during Tough Enough. She is in a relationship with model and fitness enthusiast Toni Cassano. Berenato and Cassano became engaged in February 2023.

On August 16, 2020, a South Carolina man was arrested and charged with aggravated stalking, armed burglary of a dwelling, attempted armed kidnapping, and criminal mischief for breaking into Berenato's home in Lutz, Florida. Berenato was later granted a temporary injunction against "stalking violence".

Berenato was arrested in Atlantic City, New Jersey in February 2023 for possessing a firearm without a permit. She was released on a summons for a future court date.

Mixed martial arts record 

|Loss
|align=center|2–1
|Jasmine Pouncy
|Decision (unanimous)
|University of MMA: Fight Night 9
|March 8, 2015
|3
|6:00
|Los Angeles, California, United States
|
|-
|Win
|align=center|2–0
|Jeselia Perez
|TKO (punches)
|CFL HD 2: Bitter Rivals
|February 7, 2015
|2
|2:00
|Victorville, California, United States
|
|-
|Win
|align=center|1–0
|Allenita Perez
|Submission (guillotine choke)
|CFL HD 1: Mavericks, No Guts No Glory
|October 11, 2014
|3
|1:09
|Adelanto, California, United States
|
|}

Championships and accomplishments 
 Pro Wrestling Illustrated
 Ranked No. 56 of the top 100 female wrestlers in the PWI Women's 100 in 2020
 WWE
 Bumpy Awards (1 time)
 Best Dressed of the Half-Year (2021) – with Seth Rollins

References

External links 

 
 
 

Living people
1993 births
American female professional wrestlers
American female mixed martial artists
Mixed martial artists utilizing wrestling
American professional wrestlers of Italian descent
American victims of crime
Lesbian sportswomen
LGBT mixed martial artists
LGBT people from New Jersey
LGBT professional wrestlers
American LGBT sportspeople
Mixed martial artists from New Jersey
People from Los Alamitos, California
People from Shamong Township, New Jersey
Professional wrestling authority figures
Tough Enough contestants
21st-century American women
21st-century professional wrestlers